Tii may be,

Tii language of Indonesia
Tiene language of DRCongo (ISO code [tii])
Tii (song), an Estonian song
TII, IATA airport code for Tarinkot Airport, in southeastern Afghanistan
 Tiye (c. 1398 BC – 1338 BC, wife of Egyptian pharaoh Amenhotep III.
Transport Infrastructure Ireland

See also

 TT (disambiguation)
 T2 (disambiguation)
 
 
 IIT (disambiguation)
 ITI (disambiguation)